Pruchnik is a rural town in Jarosław County, Subcarpathian Voivodeship, in south-eastern Poland. It is the seat of the administrative district called Gmina Pruchnik.

The town has a population of 3,519. Pruchnik gained town rights in around 1370; the status of a town was lost in 1935, and restored on 1 January 2011.

History

The history of Pruchnik dates back to the 14th century, when the region of Red Ruthenia was annexed into the Kingdom of Poland (1340). The village, together with a nearby castle, belonged to the noble Pruchnicki family, after which the town is named. Due to its location, away from main roads and railway lines, Pruchnik is regarded as one of the most picturesque towns of former Galicia, with a number of unique wooden houses, most of which built in the second half of the 19th century. The town also has a medieval St. Nicolas church, which was remodelled in the late 17th century, and ruins of the castle, located some 4 kilometers away, along the road to Jarosław.

Pruchnik was first mentioned in documents from 1397. History of the town is tied with the Pruchnicki family (Korczak coat of arms), which founded a local Roman Catholic parish some time in the second half of the 14th century. At that time, the village was part of Poland's Ruthenian Voivodeship. In 1498, Pruchnik was burned in a Vallachian raid, and in 1524, a Crimean Tatar unit tried to capture the town, but was defeated in a skirmish. Pruchnik remained a small town, destroyed by fires (1635, 1720). Complete destruction took place in 1657, when Pruchnik was burned to the ground by Transylvanian army of George II Rakoczi (see Swedish invasion of Poland).

In 1772 (see Partitions of Poland), Pruchnik was annexed by the Habsburg Empire, and remained in Austrian Galicia until 1918. In 1888, its population consisted of 740 Roman Catholics, 188 Greek-Catholics, and 188 Jews. The town remained a private property until 1929, when its last owner, Countess Klementyna Szembekowa died. In 1935, it lost its town charter, remaining a village until 2011.

References

Cities and towns in Podkarpackie Voivodeship
Jarosław County
Kingdom of Galicia and Lodomeria
Lwów Voivodeship